The International Federation of Pedestrians (IFP) is an umbrella federation for national pedestrian organisations, promoting and defending walking as a form of sustainable mobility throughout the world. IFP was founded in 1963, and received UN accreditation in 1971.

References 

International non-profit organizations
Walking
Pedestrian activism

External links